Sir John Legard, 1st Baronet (1631 – 1 July 1678), of Ganton in Yorkshire, was an English landowner and Member of Parliament.

He was the eldest son of John Legard of Ganton (b. 1606) and was made a baronet in 1660 by King Charles II for his family's support for the Royalist cause.

He was elected to Parliament in 1660 as member for Scarborough, though he only represented the borough for a few months. In December of the same year he was created a baronet.

Legard died in 1678. In 1655 he had married Grace Darcy (d. 1658), daughter of The Earl of Holderness. They had one child Grace, who married John Hill of Thornton. After the death of his first wife he remarried, on 12 August 1658, his second wife being Frances Widdrington, daughter of Sir Thomas Widdrington, a former Speaker of the House of Commons. They had six children:
 John (1659–1715), who succeeded him in the baronetcy
 Dorothy, who married Thomas Grimston of Grimston Garth
 Frances, who married George Bowes
 Thomas
 William
 Widdrington

References

|-

Legard, John
Legard, John
People from Ganton
English landowners
Legard, John, 1st Baronet
Legard, John
Members of the Parliament of England for constituencies in Yorkshire